Patrick James Morrisey (born December 21, 1967) is an American politician and attorney  serving as the 34th Attorney General of West Virginia since 2013. He is a member of the Republican Party.

Morrisey was elected Attorney General of West Virginia in 2012, becoming the first Republican to serve in the role since 1933. Running for the United States Senate in 2018, Morrisey won the Republican Party nomination, but was narrowly defeated by incumbent Democratic Senator Joe Manchin in the November general election.

Early life and education
Born in Brooklyn, New York, Morrisey grew up in Edison, New Jersey. His father was an account manager at U.S. Steel, while his mother worked as a registered nurse. Morrisey ran cross-country and played on his high school's tennis team, before he graduated from St. Thomas Aquinas High School / Bishop George Ahr High School in 1985.

Morrisey graduated with honors from Rutgers College with a Bachelor of Arts in history and political science in 1989. He also attended Rutgers School of Law–Newark, receiving his juris doctor in 1992.

Career in law and lobbying
After graduating from Rutgers, Morrisey lived in Westfield, New Jersey and opened a private law firm in 1992. He practiced health care, election, regulatory and communications law at Arent Fox, a national white shoe law firm and lobbying firm, from 1995 to 1999.

Morrisey served as deputy staff director and chief health counsel for the United States House Committee on Energy and Commerce from 1999 to 2004, where he worked on the passage of the Public Health Security and Bioterrorism Preparedness Response Act and the Medicare Prescription Drug, Improvement, and Modernization Act (establishing Medicare Part D). He ran unsuccessfully for the United States House of Representatives in New Jersey's 7th congressional district in 2000, receiving 9% of the vote in the Republican primary.

From 2004 to 2012, Morrisey worked as a lobbyist in Washington D.C. He worked for the corporate law firm Sidley Austin before he joined King & Spalding in 2010, becoming a partner. As a lobbyist, he was viewed as an expert on health and drug-related regulations and legislation. He was paid $250,000 to lobby on behalf of a pharmaceutical trade group. The group was funded by some of the same opioid distributors that West Virginia sued for flooding the state with opioids.

Attorney General
In 2012, Morrisey ran for Attorney General of West Virginia against Darrell McGraw, a five-term incumbent. He defeated McGraw and was sworn in on January 14, 2013, making him the first Republican state Attorney General to serve in West Virginia since 1933.

Federal lawsuits

DEA opioid lawsuit
Morrisey sued the Drug Enforcement Administration (DEA) to release its data on opioid sales, and about the sales quota system that it uses to regulate opioid manufacturers, the first ever such lawsuit in West Virginia history. He placed a hold on the lawsuit after successfully negotiating with the Trump administration to have the DEA reconsider whether or not to amend the aggregate quota system.

Patient Protection and Affordable Care Act
In 2014, Morrisey filed suit against the Federal government of the United States, challenging regulatory changes described by the Obama Administration as an administrative fix to the implementation of the Patient Protection and Affordable Care Act (ACA).

Morrisey's lawsuit, State of West Virginia v. U.S. Department of Health and Human Services, was dismissed by the United States District Court for the District of Columbia in 2015. Morrisey appealed to the U.S. Court of Appeals for the District of Columbia, which in 2016 again rejected the suit, finding that West Virginia has suffered no injury-in-fact and thus lacked standing.

Environmental Protection Agency
Morrisey's office has filed a number of lawsuits and amicus briefs challenging the United States Environmental Protection Agency (EPA).

In August 2014, Morrisey filed a lawsuit, along with 11 other states, challenging the EPA's proposal to regulate coal-fired power plants as part of then President Barack Obama's plan to mitigate climate change. This suit resulted in a historic 2016 stay in the Supreme Court.

American Farm Bureau v. EPA. On September 13, 2013, in American Farm Bureau Federation v. EPA, the United States District Court for the Middle District of Pennsylvania said that the EPA had the authority under the Clean Water Act to impose a total maximum daily load standard for pollutants and that the procedures established were consistent with the Administrative Procedure Act. This is contrary to the argument by Morrisey's amicus brief, which said that the "EPA's overreach in the Chesapeake Bay Total Maximum Daily Load (TDML) infringes states' traditional rights the Clean Water Act intended to protect."

Mingo Logan Coal v. EPA. On March 24, 2014, in Mingo Logan Coal Company v. EPA, the Supreme Court of the United States denied the petition for writ of certiorari. The Court rejected the argument in Morrisey's brief that said that the "EPA unlawfully vetoed permits issued by the United States Army Corps of Engineers."

White Stallion v. EPA. On April 15, 2014, in White Stallion Energy Center v. EPA, the United States Court of Appeals for the District of Columbia Circuit said that the EPA's Mercury and Air Toxics Standard (MATS) rule regulation of emissions from coal-fired electric generating units was appropriate and necessary and that the EPA acted within its legal authority and demonstrated a reasonable connection between its action and the record of decision. The Court rejected the argument in Morrisey's brief that said that the "EPA rule usurped the states' authority by setting minimum substantive requirements for state performance standards."

Homer City v. EPA. On April 29, 2014, in EPA v. EME Homer City Generation, the U.S. Supreme Court said the EPA's Cross-State Air Pollution Rule was a cost-effective allocation of emission reductions among upwind States and is a permissible, workable, and equitable interpretation of the Good Neighbor Provision. The Court rejected the argument in Morrisey's brief that claimed that the "EPA exceeded its authority under the federal Clean Air Act when it promulgated the Cross-State Air Pollution Rule".

Utility Air v. EPA. On June 23, 2014, in Utility Air Regulatory Group v. EPA, the U.S. Supreme Court said that the EPA reasonably interpreted the Act to require sources that would need permits based on their emission of conventional pollutants to comply with Best Available Control Technology (BACT) for greenhouse gases and that EPA's decision to require BACT for greenhouse gases emitted by sources otherwise subject to Prevention of Significant Deterioration (PSD) review is, as a general matter, a permissible interpretation of the statute. The Court rejected the argument in Morrisey's brief that said that the "EPA violated the U.S. Constitution and the Clean Air Act by concocting greenhouse gas regulations" and that court needed to "rein in a usurpatious agency and remind the President and his subordinates that they cannot rule by executive decree."

Murray Energy v. EPA. On June 25, 2014, Morrisey and other attorneys general submitted an amicus brief in Murray Energy v. EPA before the U.S. Court of Appeals, D.C. Circuit This lawsuit was prematurely filed before EPA had issued the final standards, which were not due until June 1, 2015. The D.C. Circuit had already ruled less than two years earlier in December 2012 on this issue in Las Brisas Energy Center v. EPA. The court dismissed the case with a single short sentence: "The challenged proposed rule is not final agency action subject to judicial review."

National Mining v. EPA. On July 11, 2014, in National Mining Association vs EPA, the United States Court of Appeals for the District of Columbia Circuit said that the EPA and the U.S. Corps of Engineers had the statutory authority under the Clean Water Act to enact a procedure rule (Enhanced Coordination Process memorandum) to review mountaintop mining permits. The Court rejected the argument in Morrisey's brief that claimed that the "EPA was attempting to take for itself responsibilities reserved to the states and other federal agencies."

West Virginia et al. v. EPA. On July 31, 2014, Morrisey and attorneys general from other states filed a lawsuit West Virginia et al. v. EPA in the United States Court of Appeals for the District of Columbia Circuit challenging a court ordered settlement over three years earlier on March 2, 2011, between the EPA and 11 states - New York, California, Connecticut, Delaware, Maine, New Mexico, Oregon, Rhode Island, Vermont, Washington, Massachusetts, and the District of Columbia. In this settlement, EPA promised to issue its now-pending rule establishing standards of performance for greenhouse gas (GHG) emissions from Electric Utility Steam Generating Units (EGUs). A settlement was reached based on guidance from the U.S. Supreme Court ruling in Massachusetts v. Environmental Protection Agency in 2007 where the Supreme Court held that carbon dioxide is an air pollutant subject to regulation under the Clean Air Act. The attorneys general lawsuit is over three years late. The EPA published the proposed settlement in December 2010, and Section 113(g) of the Clean Air Act allows a 30-day period to challenge any requirements of the Clean Air Act.

In Morrisey's lawsuit against the EPA he said that the Clean Air Act "precludes EPA from directing States to establish standards of performance for any existing source for any air pollutant." The U.S. Court of Appeals for the District of Columbia Court disagreed with Morrisey, and on June 9, 2015, said it "denied the petition for review and the petition for a writ of prohibition because the proposed rule of concern is not final. The Court only claims authority to review the legality of final agency rules, not proposals."

Clean Power Plan litigation

West Virginia et al. v. EPA (challenged draft Clean Power Plan rule). On August 1, 2014, West Virginia and 12 states had filed suit to block the draft Clean Power Plan rule.
On June 9, 2015, the U.S. Court of Appeals for the District of Columbia Circuit rejects Patrick Morrisey's challenge to draft Clean Power Plan rule, which he filed on September 3, 2014, as being premature, because the rule was a draft rule, not a final rule, and had not yet been published in the Federal Register.

West Virginia et al. v. EPA (Motion for Expedition of challenge to Clean Power Plan). On October 21, 2014, the U.S. Court of Appeals for the District of Columbia Circuit denied Patrick Morrisey's Motion for Expedition of hearing on challenge to Clean Power Plan, which he filed on September 3, 2014. On June 2, 2014, the EPA had released the draft Clean Power Plan. On September 2, 2014, New York and 11 states had filed a petition in support of the Clean Power Plan. 

West Virginia et al. v. EPA (request for emergency stay of final Clean Power Plan rule). On September 9, 2015, the U.S. Court of Appeals for the District of Columbia Circuit refused to grant Patrick Morrisey's request for an emergency stay in the Clean Power Plan. On August 5, 2015. West Virginia and 12 states had requested to halt implementation of the Clean Power Plan until the courts make a ruling. On August 13, 2015. West Virginia and 12 states had filed a petition for an emergency stay. On August 3, 2015, the EPA had announced the final rule for the Clean Power Plan. On August 14, 2015, California and 15 states had filed a petition in support of the Clean Power Plan.

West Virginia et al. v. EPA (request to deny implementation of Clean Power Plan). On January 21, 2016, the U.S. Court of Appeals for the District of Columbia Circuit denied Patrick Morrisey's request to halt implementation of the Clean Power Plan until litigation is concluded. On October 23, 2015, West Virginia and 24 states had filed suit against the Clean Power Plan. On October 23, 2015, the EPA had published the Clean Power Plan in the Federal Register.

West Virginia et al. v. EPA (request to stay Clean Power Plan). January 26, 2016. West Virginia and 24 states filed suit to stay the Clean Power Plan before the U.S. Supreme Court. On February 9, 2016, the U.S. Supreme Court granted a stay of Clean Power Plan while the case is litigated in the U.S. Court of Appeals for the District of Columbia Circuit. On March 16, 2016, New York and 19 states filed a petition in support of the Clean Power Plan. Oral arguments are scheduled for September 27, 2016 on the Clean Power Plan. In February 2016 the Court sided with Morrisey, issuing a Stay.

Second Amendment
Morrisey has filed several amicus briefs in lawsuits challenging Second Amendment decisions.
 
Kachalsky v. Cacace. On April 15, 2013, the U.S. Supreme Court refused to hear an appeal in Kachalsky v. Cacace, which challenged a New York law that requires a person to show a particular need to obtain a permit to carry a firearm outside the home. 
Morrisey and attorneys general from other states had submitted a brief challenging the lower court decision saying that the law "does not survive any level of scrutiny".

Drake v. Jerejian. On May 5, 2014, the U.S. Supreme Court refused to hear an appeal in Drake v. Jerejian, which challenged New Jersey's requirement that concealed carry permit applicants must demonstrate a "justifiable need" in order to be issued a handgun carry permit. Morrisey and attorneys general from other states had submitted a brief challenging the lower court decision saying that New Jersey's law would "threaten" and "shake the foundation" of less restricting gun permitting schemes in other states."

Abramski v. United States. On June 16. 2014, the U.S. Supreme Court in Abramski v. United States of America said that "regardless whether the actual buyer could have purchased the gun, a person who buys a gun on someone else's behalf while falsely claiming that it is for himself makes a material misrepresentation punishable" under the law. This is contrary to the claim made by Morrisey that the "Department of Justice wants to ensnare innocent West Virginian gun owners in a web of criminal laws if they try to sell their guns" and that "the administration's interpretation oversteps the law and could make criminals out of innocent citizens."

New York State Rifle & Pistol Association v. Cuomo and Connecticut Citizens' Defense League v. Malloy. On October 19, 2015, the U.S. Court of Appeals for the Second Circuit in New York State Rifle & Pistol Association v. Cuomo and Connecticut Citizens said that "The core prohibitions by New York and Connecticut of assault weapons and large-capacity magazines do not violate the Second Amendment." This is contrary to the claim made by Morrisey and other state attorneys general that the "New York's outright prohibition of semi-automatic firearms burdens the fundamental right to keep and bear arms" and "New York's ban of semi-automatic firearms cannot survive strict scrutiny"

Friedman v. City of Highland Park. On December 7, 2015, the U.S. Supreme Court refused to hear an appeal of the case Friedman v. City of Highland Park. Morrisey and other attorneys general had filed an amicus brief saying that the ruling by the U.S. Court of Appeals for the Seventh Circuit was a "threat posed by narrow judicial construction of the Second Amendment to their citizens and policies." The U.S. Court of Appeals for the Seventh Circuit earlier on April 7, 2015 dismissed Morrisey's arguments saying "Assault weapons with large-capacity magazines can fire more shots, faster, and thus can be more dangerous in aggregate. Why else are they the weapons of choice in mass shootings?"

Peruta v. County of San Diego. On June 9, 2016, the 9th U.S. Circuit Court of Appeals in Peruta v. County of San Diego said that "We hold that the Second Amendment does not preserve or protect a right of a member of the general public to carry concealed firearms in public." This is contrary to the claim made by Morrisey and other state attorneys general that the "New York's outright prohibition of semi-automatic firearms burdens the fundamental right to keep and bear arms" and "New York's ban of semi-automatic firearms cannot survive strict scrutiny."

Kolbe v. Hogan. In August 2017, Morrisey led a 21-state coalition to urge the Supreme Court to hear arguments against, and urging the court to strike down, a weapons ban in Maryland. His coalition argued that the weapons ban infringes on the rights of law-abiding gun owners. The Maryland weapons ban prohibits the sales, transfer, and possession of certain semiautomatic firearms and standard-capacity magazines. The coalition, in its brief with the Supreme Court, was referring to a ruling from the 4th U.S. Circuit Court of Appeals that struck down the ban. If the appeals court's decision is upheld, it would set case law that governs similar laws in West Virginia, Maryland, North Carolina, South Carolina, and Virginia.

Supreme Court 
In late January 2017, President Trump nominated Judge Neil Gorsuch to the Supreme Court to replace the late Antonin Scalia. The following day, Morrisey sent a letter to Senate leaders along with the Attorneys General of 19 other states to express support for Gorsuch and urge the Senate to confirm him without delay. Morrisey said he wrote the letter out of concern for the court's impact on residents of West Virginia, citing a 2016 court decision (5-4, with Antonin Scalia casting the crucial vote) to stay President Obama's Clean Power Plan, which Morrisey believed would put people out of work.

2020 Presidential election intervention 

On December 8, 2020, Texas Attorney General Ken Paxton sued the states of Georgia, Michigan, Wisconsin, and Pennsylvania, where certified results showed Joe Biden the electoral victor over President Donald Trump.

By December 2020, Paxton had been under indictment on securities fraud charges relating to activities prior to taking office, and in October 2020, numerous high-level assistants of his own office have accused him of involvement in "bribery, abuse of office and other crimes".

Morrisey joined Paxton's lawsuit seeking to overturn the results of the presidential election by challenging election processes in four states where Trump lost. He had repeated an abundance of false, disproven and unsupported allegations regarding mail-in ballots and voting in those four battlegrounds. The news came after West Virginia's Governor Jim Justice, who had yet to congratulate Biden for winning the presidency, said Trump called him to discuss the lawsuit. He said he encouraged Morrisey to join the Texan's attempt. "I'm sure our attorney general will make the right move," said Justice, a strong Trump supporter.

Secretary of State Mac Warner on Wednesday declared the state's election results, becoming the last in the nation to certify the winner of the presidential race. He said the Texas lawsuit is a “novel approach” and supported letting the courts decide.

Texas and 16 other states' Attorneys General<ref>West Virginia backs Texas effort to invalidate Biden’s win, Associated Press. Cuenyt Dil, December 9, 2020. Retrieved December 24, 2020.</ref>  who support Paxton's challenge of the election results alleged numerous instances of unconstitutional actions in the four states' presidential ballot tallies, arguments that had already been rejected in other state and federal courts. In Texas v. Pennsylvania, Paxton asked the United States Supreme Court to invalidate the states' sixty-two electoral votes, allowing Trump to be declared the winner of a second presidential term. Because the suit has been characterized as a dispute between states, the Supreme Court retains original jurisdiction, though it frequently declines to hear such suits. There was no evidence of consequential illegal voting in the election. Paxton's lawsuit included claims that had been tried unsuccessfully in other courts and shown to be false. Officials from each of the four states described Paxton's lawsuit as having recycled false and disproven claims of irregularity. The merits of the objections were sharply criticized by legal experts and politicians. Election law expert Rick Hasen described the lawsuit as "the dumbest case I've ever seen filed on an emergency basis at the Supreme Court." Nebraska Republican Senator Ben Sasse said the situation of Paxton initiating the lawsuit, "looks like a fella begging for a pardon filed a PR stunt", in reference to Paxton's own state and federal legal issues (securities fraud charges and abuse of office allegations). On December 11, the U.S. Supreme Court quickly rejected the suit which Morrisey had joined, in an unsigned opinion.

Political positions

Abortion
Morrisey opposes abortion and joined 12 states in supporting a brief in favor of North Carolina's 20-week abortion ban. Morrisey investigated Planned Parenthood's activities in West Virginia and was endorsed for the U.S. Senate by West Virginians for Life.

Opioid addiction
Morrisey has promoted a "Combating Addiction with Grace" partnership, a joint effort between law enforcement and faith leaders to combat opioid abuse. He has also focused on attempting to substitute opioids with other non-narcotics as first-treatments for pain management. Morrisey asked West Virginia lawmakers to consider an "anti-retaliation" program to eliminate negative consequences inflicted upon prescribers who refuse to issue opioid medications, which was passed into law in 2018.

Morrisey supported President Trump's declaration of the opioid crisis as a national emergency.

Sanctuary cities
Morrisey led a multi-state coalition of attorneys general in defending the right of states to prohibit sanctuary cities within their borders. A unanimous federal appeals court decision found in favor of the states.

Guns
Morrisey has A+ ratings from the National Rifle Association and the West Virginia Citizen's Defense League. He has secured reciprocity agreements with other states, allowing the concealed carry licenses of other states to be valid within West Virginia, and vice versa.

Immigration
In July 2017, Texas Attorney General Ken Paxton led a group of Republican Attorneys General from nine other states, including Morrisey, plus Idaho Governor Butch Otter, in threatening the Donald Trump administration that they would litigate if the president did not terminate the Deferred Action for Childhood Arrivals (DACA) policy that had been put into place by President Barack Obama.SPLC denounces letter from 10 Attorneys General seeking "cruel and heartless" repeal of DACA, Southern Poverty Law Center, June 30, 2017. Retrieved September 2, 2017. On September 5, 2017, Trump rescinded the DACA policy. He delayed implementation for six months to allow Congress the time to legislate a solution for young people eligible for DACA. Morrisey supported Trump's move and said "I applaud President Trump for having the courage of his convictions to uphold the rule of law and stop this Obama-era program. DACA was unconstitutional and represented an unlawful, unilateral action by the Obama administration."

In June 2018, Morrisey was among Republican candidates for the U.S. Senate seeking to cast the blame for the Trump administration family separation policy on their Democratic opponents. Morrisey criticized West Virginia U.S. Senator Joe Manchin for supporting the "Keep Families Together Act" authored by Dianne Feinstein, arguing that Manchin was "putting the interest of illegal immigrant criminals and the agenda of liberal Washington elites ahead of West Virginia families."

 Drug companies 
In 2013, questions arose about Morrisey's ties to Cardinal Health, his campaign funds, and the ongoing lawsuit filed against Cardinal Health. After Morrisey said he had recused himself from the suit, he met privately on several occasions with representatives of the company. Additionally, Cardinal Health paid nearly $1,500,000 to Morrisey's wife's lobbying firm. Although the West Virginia Bar found that Morrisey's previous role as a lobbyist was not an ethics violation, it said his wife's association with Cardinal Health could "diminish the integrity of the process and create the appearance of impropriety." Eventually, Cardinal Health settled a lawsuit brought by the state attorney general's office by paying a $20,000,000 fine for violating consumer protection laws.

In 2016, Morrisey ended a lawsuit against Miami-Luken, a drug firm that sold excessive and suspicious amounts of opioids to small towns across West Virginia, after the drug firm paid $2.5 million to settle. According to The Charleston Gazette'', "Morrisey, a former lobbyist for a trade group that represents Miami-Luken and other drug distributors, inherited the lawsuit in 2013 after ousting longtime Attorney General Darrell McGraw." It was the largest settlement against pharmaceutical companies in West Virginia's history.

Sex trafficking 
In 2017, Morrisey joined a coalition of 50 state and territorial attorneys general in pushing Congress to pass legislation that would affirm that all law-enforcement agencies retain their traditional authority to fight sex trafficking. In a letter to Congress, the bipartisan group asked to amend the Communications Decency Act to legally confirm that states, localities and territories retain authority to investigate and prosecute child sex trafficking criminals wherever they operate, including online.

2018 U.S. Senate election 

On July 10, 2017, Morrisey announced his intention to run for the U.S. Senate seat currently held by Joe Manchin. During the Republican primary, he ran as a conservative and presented himself as an outsider in contrast to Rep. Evan Jenkins. During the primary, Morrisey was attacked by his main opponents, Jenkins and Don Blankenship, for his career as a lobbyist. Amid criticism of Morrisey's lobbying career, as well as his wife's lobbying career, the Morrisey campaign pledged that his wife would stop lobbying if Morrisey were to win election to the Senate. On May 8, 2018, Morrisey defeated Jenkins and Don Blankenship in the Republican primary with more than 34% of the votes (47,571 votes).

In the November 2018 general election, Morrisey was defeated by incumbent Democratic U.S. Senator Joe Manchin. Manchin received 49.6% of the vote to Morrisey's 46.3%, with Libertarian candidate Rusty Hollen receiving 4.2% of the votes cast.

Personal life 
Morrisey moved to Jefferson County, West Virginia in 2006. His wife, Denise, has worked as a lobbyist in the District of Columbia for over 30 years.

Electoral history 

{| class="wikitable"
|-
! colspan="4" |West Virginia Attorney General Election, 2016
|-
|Party
|Candidate
|Votes
|%
|-
|Republican
|Patrick Morrisey
|356,015
|51.64
|-
|Democratic
|Doug Reynolds
|289,263
|41.96

{| class="wikitable"
|-
! colspan="4" |West Virginia Attorney General Election, 2020
|-
|Party
|Candidate
|Votes
|%
|-
|Republican
|Patrick Morrisey
|487,250
|63.77
|-
|Democratic
|Sam Brown Petsonk
|276,798
|36.23

References

External links 

Official Attorney General website
Official campaign website 

|-

1967 births
21st-century American politicians
St. Thomas Aquinas High School (New Jersey) alumni
Candidates in the 2018 United States Senate elections
Living people
New Jersey lawyers
New Jersey Republicans
People from Edison, New Jersey
People from Harpers Ferry, West Virginia
People from Westfield, New Jersey
Rutgers School of Law–Newark alumni
Rutgers University alumni
2016 United States presidential electors
West Virginia Attorneys General
West Virginia lawyers
West Virginia Republicans